Khiri Mat is the southernmost district (amphoe) of Sukhothai province, in the lower northern region of Thailand.

Geography
Neighboring districts are (from the northwest clockwise) Ban Dan Lan Hoi, Mueang Sukhothai and Kong Krailat of Sukhothai Province, Bang Rakam of Phitsanulok province and Phran Kratai of Kamphaeng Phet province.

History
The district was renamed from Tanot to Khiri Mat in 1939.

Administration
The district is divided into 10 sub-districts (tambons), which are further subdivided into 101 villages (mubans). There are two townships (thesaban tambons): Tanot covers parts of tambon Tanot, and Thung Luang tambon Thung Luang. There are a further nine tambon administrative organizations (TAO).

References

External links
amphoe.com

Khiri Mat